Chris Thompson (born July 11, 1976) is an American professional golfer currently playing on the PGA Tour.

Early life and education
Thompson attended the University of Kansas where he was a two-time all-American, the first to do so at the university. He earned a degree in Business Administration.

Career
Thompson turned professional in 1999 and qualified for the Web.com Tour in 2007. He played in 30 events that year, with only 16 starts in 2008 and losing his tour status. He failed to qualify for the Web.com Tour in 2015 by missing a birdie putt on his final hole of the tour's qualifying tournament. He qualified for the tour in 2018 and finished the season as one of the most productive players.

Thompson earned his PGA Tour card for the 2018–19 season after finishing in the top 25 on the Web.com Tour money list, becoming a rookie on the tour at the age of 42. Going into the tour, he had nine professional victories, including the 2014 Nebraska Open.

See also
2018 Web.com Tour Finals graduates

References

External links
 
 

American male golfers
Kansas Jayhawks men's golfers
PGA Tour golfers
Korn Ferry Tour graduates
Golfers from Kansas
People from Independence, Kansas
Sportspeople from Lawrence, Kansas
1976 births
Living people